Alan Mara Bateman (6 January 1889 – 11 May 1971) was an economic geologist who worked on mining in North America and a professor at Yale University who also served as a long-standing editor of the journal Economic Geology. He also wrote several textbooks on mining including the Formation of Mineral Deposits. 

Bateman was born to Elizabeth Mara and George Bateman in Kingston, Ontario. He grew up with outdoor skills and played football and soccer at Queens University where he graduated in 1910 with a degree in mining engineering and geology. He then joined Yale University and studied under John D. Irving, L.V. Pirsson, Edward S. Dana and William E. Ford. He worked with the geological survey of Canada in 1911 in British Columbia. He received a PhD from Yale in 1913 with a thesis on geology and ore deposits of the Bridge River district, British Columbia. He then worked on mining related work in Alaska at the Kennecott Mines. In 1915 he became an instructor at Yale University teaching economic geology with John Irving who died in 1918 during war service which left the editorship of the journal Economic Geology to Bateman. Bateman wrote a textbook Economic Mineral Deposits first published in 1942, with a second edition in 1950 which was translated into several languages and a third in 1981.

He married Grace Hotchkiss Street of New Haven in 1916. Bateman died at home in New Haven.

References

External links 
 Alaska Mining Hall of Fame

1889 births
1971 deaths
Yale University faculty
Yale University alumni
Canadian geologists